Qaf Dhu Haydan is a sub-district located in Al Ashah District, 'Amran Governorate, Yemen. Qaf Dhu Haydan had a population of 1910 according to the 2004 census.

References 

Sub-districts in Al Ashah District